Kabilasi may refer to:

Kabilasi, Janakpur
Kabilasi, Sagarmatha